The Cup of Life is a 1921 American crime drama film directed by Rowland V. Lee and starring Niles Welch, Madge Bellamy and Hobart Bosworth.

Plot

Cast
 Niles Welch as Roy Bradley or Warren Bradford 
 Madge Bellamy as Pain 
 Hobart Bosworth as 'Bully' Brand 
 Tully Marshall as Chan Chang 
 Monte Collins as Larry Donovan 
 May Wallace as Mollie

References

Bibliography
 Rainey, Buck. Sweethearts of the Sage: Biographies and Filmographies of 258 actresses appearing in Western movies. McFarland & Company, 1992.

External links

1921 films
1921 crime drama films
American crime drama films
Films directed by Rowland V. Lee
American silent feature films
American black-and-white films
1921 drama films
Films with screenplays by Joseph F. Poland
1920s English-language films
1920s American films
Silent American drama films